Joyà is an 80-minute long resident show at the Vidanta resort in the Riviera Maya, Mexico, produced as a collaboration between Cirque du Soleil and its subsidiary Cirque du Soleil Events + Experiences (formerly 45 Degrees). It is Cirque du Soleil's first resident show in Latin America.

Culture meets nature 
Joyà premiered on November 8, 2014, inside a custom-built theatre set in the jungle, with a 600 guests capacity.  The exterior design of the theatre was inspired by organic forms in a clearing surrounded by trees. Before excavation and construction of the theatre could begin, biologists meticulously identified all flora and fauna specimens inhabiting the site, so that they could be relocated in similar surroundings prior to the groundbreaking ceremony. This important aspect of the project inspired the creators of Joyà to develop a story centered around a character who devotes his life to the study and protection of Yucatan's natural and historic environment.

Story 
The story, set in a naturalist's library that transforms into other exotic locations, follows the journey of a "rebellious teenage girl [who] is sent by her mischievous grandfather on a fantastical quest spanning generations". Throughout her adventures, the energetic and joyful Joyà encounters a series of colorful characters inspired by natural and cultural phenomena that have shaped Mexico and Mexican culture throughout History. In so doing, she experiences a vibrant and colorful coming of age which prepares her to take over her grandfather's commitment to Mexico's natural and cultural wonders. The creators of the show have cited the annual migration of monarch butterflies between Mexico and Canada as an important source of inspiration for the overall theme of the show; every year, the monarch's migration, essential to the survival of the species, can only be accomplished through the combined efforts of successive generations of butterflies.

Culinary experience 
The cultural experience offered by Cirque du Soleil and Vidanta consists in a hybrid form of entertainment wherein the show is presented in a venue where spectators are seated in a semi-circular dining hall facing an immersive setting where the story of Joyà unfolds around the public and over their heads. While enjoying the acrobatic performances, patrons can thus enjoy a refined dining experience designed to echo the creativity of the circus acts and the refinement of Mexican culture.

Acts
Icarian games: One of the performer lies on his back on a specially designed chair and flips, twirls and spins another performer on his feet.
Solo trapeze: A strong, energetic artist swings over the stage on a duplex trapeze.
Hand to hand: Two strong, flexible performers slowly move through positions requiring careful balance.
Puppetry: Artist manipulate large puppets onstage, including a giant angler fish.
Hand balancing: An artist balances on three canes set up on a small stage among the diners' tables to bring the action off the main stage.
Aerial straps: Artists, hanging in the air from straps, fly above the stage and execute a series of acrobatic stunts.
Trampoline wall: Performers bounce off a trampoline at the base of a wall-like structure, allowing them to run up the wall, do twists and turns through the air, and jump through windows in the wall.

Acts in rotation
Aerial ring trio: Three women performs stunts on hoops suspended in mid-air.
Rola Bola: One artist balances on variously shaped cylinders on top of a table. This act is a replacement for Icarian Games.

Music
The soundtrack to Joya was released in the show boutique on 24 December 2015 before being released online on 15 January 2016. The tracks are as follows:
  Naturalium (Opening/Juggling)
  Comedy Of Errors (Icarian games)
  Reinas En La Penumbra (Duo trapeze)
  Adventure At Sea (Pirates' arrival/Hand to hand)
  The Dive (Puppetry)
  Profunda Belleza (Hand balancing)
  Legacy (Aerial straps)
  Nueva Era (Trampoline wall/Skipping/Finale)

References

Further reading
 Feldberg, Sarah. "Cirque du Soleil's experiment in the Mexican jungle". USA Today. December 22, 2014.
 Young, Josh. "Joya Opens As Cirque Du Soleil’s First Immersive Dinner Show". Theme Park University. December 29, 2014.
 Frederick, Brittany S. "Review: Inside Cirque du Soleil And Grupo Vidanta's New Production 'Joya'". Starpulse.com. December 3, 2014.

Cirque du Soleil resident shows